Beatrix Pang (Chinese: Pang Sin Kwok 彭倩幗) is a visual artist, cultural producer, educator and independent publisher based in Hong Kong. She has a BA in Photographic Design (2000) from School of Design, Hong Kong Polytechnic University and MA Photography (2005) from Bergen National Academy of the Arts, Norway.

Work
Pang primarily works in photography, video art and installation art. Pang's works have been widely exhibited locally and internationally, selected for the Asian Art Biennale (2007) at the National Museum of Fine Arts, Taichung, Taiwan and the Hong Kong Art Biennial 2005. Pang's work is included in the collections of the Macao Museum of Art.

Fellowship
In 2003, Pang was received a scholarship from The Ministry of Education and Research of Norway to pursue her master's degree study. Pang's video installation for the Hong Kong Art Biennale 2005 was titled "Distance = Time x Speed" and explored her journey as an artist from a young person in Hong Kong to her time as a graduate student in Norway. As a part of the November 2005 opening of "Beyond: 2nd Guangzhou Triennial" at the Guangdong Museum of Art, Pang collaborated with professor of design Matthew Turner and the Asia Art Archive in organizing a one-day symposium entitled "Trading Places: Cultural Imaginaries of the Pearl River Delta."

In 2009, Pang received the Asian Cultural Council fellowship, supported by The Starr Foundation, to conduct research on community art and photography in the US.

Projects
Pang's time in the United States inspired her to try to strengthen the independent publishing scene in Hong Kong. Pang was one of the founders of KLACK Photography and Cultural Magazine, the first issue released in summer 2010. In 2011, Pang started the independent art publishing project Small Tune Press, which produces artist’s books and zines. Small Tune Press focuses on publishing photography, drawing, collage, conceptual work and poetry. In a 2018 interview, Pang said she was inspired to start Small Tune Press in order to create a way for lesser-known artists to distribute their work to the public. “In building Small Tune Press, I consider forming alliances to be one of the most vital outcomes of this endeavor,” she said.

Pang also credited her fellow artist Susanne Bürner, who she met when Bürner was in Hong Kong doing research, for encouraging her to found Small Tune Press. The first book the press published was Bürner's “Vanishing Point: How to Disappear in China without a Trace," which examines the different roles of people in modern Chinese society.

In 2017, Pang has co-created a collective, Zine Coop, that promotes zine culture in Hong Kong by hosting production workshops. Pang also co-founded Queer Reads Library in 2018 with artist-curator Kaitlin Chan. Queer Reads Library is a mobile collection of internationally sourced queer publications and independently published zines.

Pang's experiences in the world of independent publishing have led her to become an outspoken voice for the need for a strong independent press in Hong Kong and other parts of Asia. "Independent voices remain restricted and obstructed in many places in Asia under different cultural, social, and political circumstances," she said in 2017.

Zine Coop and the 2019–20 Hong Kong protests 
Hong Kong-based zines have also been an integral part of the conversation around how artists and other creatives are participating in the 2019–20 Hong Kong protests. Zine Coop, the collective co-founded by Pang, has published zines satirizing the state of sex education in Hong Kong as well as zines discussing mental health and society pressures.

As a direct response to the Hong Kong protests, Zine Coop launched several exhibitions and events in support of the protestors. One of the most notable ones was the exhibition "Freedom-Hi" which traveled to 17 cities around the world and focused on illuminating Hong Kong's political crisis.

“[W]hat zines offer, especially for reading Hong Kong’s pro-democracy movement, is a more sit-back reflective kind of reading experience. You are not only reading hard news, but also different perspectives on the movement and different ways of self-expression," said Zine Coop member Ranee Ng.

References

Hong Kong artists
Living people
Alumni of the Hong Kong Polytechnic University
Bergen Academy of Art and Design alumni
Asian Cultural Council grantees
Year of birth missing (living people)